Pleomorphomonas diazotrophica is a Gram-negative, aerobic, pleomorphic and nitrogen-fixing bacterium species from the genus Pleomorphomonas which has been isolated from root tissue of the plant Jatropha curcas at the agrotechnology experimental station in Singapore.

References

Further reading

External links 
Type strain of Pleomorphomonas diazotrophica at BacDive -  the Bacterial Diversity Metadatabase

Hyphomicrobiales
Bacteria described in 2013